Jasir Selmani (born 21 January 1991) is a Macedonian professional footballer who plays as an attacking midfielder for Renova.

Club career
Selmani was born in Tetovo. He scored 87 goals in 112 games for the FK Shkëndija youth teams between 2003 and 2008 before being promoted to the first team for the 2008–09 season where he scored 9 goals in 11 games. He had an unsuccessful trial with Norwegian Tippeligaen side Tromsø IL in March 2009. He had an unsuccessful trial in August 2013 with Swedish side IS Halmia.

KF Gostivari announced on their official Facebook site on 21 January 2019, that they had signed Selmani.

References

1991 births
Living people
Sportspeople from Tetovo
Albanian footballers from North Macedonia
Association football midfielders
Macedonian footballers
North Macedonia youth international footballers
North Macedonia under-21 international footballers
KF Shkëndija players
FK Drita players
KF Vllaznia Shkodër players
FK Renova players
KF Ferizaj players
Follo FK players
KF Gostivari players
Macedonian First Football League players
Kategoria Superiore players
Norwegian Second Division players
Football Superleague of Kosovo players
Macedonian expatriate footballers
Expatriate footballers in Albania
Expatriate footballers in Kosovo
Expatriate footballers in Norway
Expatriate men's footballers in Denmark
Macedonian expatriate sportspeople in Albania
Macedonian expatriate sportspeople in Kosovo
Macedonian expatriate sportspeople in Norway
Macedonian expatriate sportspeople in Denmark